Kakuna is a genus of planthopper in the family Delphacidae. It is found in China and Japan. The genus was circumscribed in 1935 by Shōnen Matsumura.

References

Further reading

 
 
 

Taxa named by Shōnen Matsumura
Delphacinae
Auchenorrhyncha genera
Hemiptera of Asia